Gilles Lebreton (born 11 October 1958) is a National Front Member of the European Parliament representing West France.

References

1958 births
Living people
MEPs for West France 2014–2019
MEPs for France 2019–2024
National Rally (France) MEPs
Politicians from Brest, France
National Rally (France) politicians
Paris 2 Panthéon-Assas University alumni